Albert Dariusz Sosnowski (born 7 March 1979) is a Polish former professional boxer who challenged for the WBC heavyweight title in 2010.

Professional career
Sosnowski made his professional debut in July 1998, defeating Czech fighter Jan Drobena via first-round knockout in Outrup, Denmark. He won his first 19 fights, 12 wins by knockout.

In July 2001, Sosnowski fought for his first title belt against Canadian Arthur Cook in Budapest, Hungary, for the vacant WBC World Youth heavyweight title. Sosnowski, who was clearly ahead on points all scorecards, was knocked out by Cook in the ninth round to take the title.

In July 2008, Sosnowski lost to journeyman Zuri Lawrence, who had taken the fight on late notice but in November 2008 he defeated British fighter Danny Williams when Sosnowski himself was the underdog and he had taken the fight at late notice. He won by technical knockout after 1:17 of the 8th round.

He fought Francesco Pianeta for the EBU-EU heavyweight title on 4 April 2009 with the fight going to a draw after twelve rounds.

On 18 December 2009, Sosnowski defeated Paolo Vidoz for the EBU heavyweight title, winning by unanimous decision. He was subsequently lined up to face heavyweight Prizefighter series winner and former Olympic gold medallist, Audley Harrison for his first defence of the title, with the fight being scheduled for 9 April 2010. He cancelled this fight for a shot at Vitali Klitschko for his WBC title. Sosnowski lost to Klitschko by 10th-round knockout after being worn down by shots to the head throughout the fight.

Professional boxing record

{|class="wikitable" style="text-align:center; font-size:95%"
|-
!
!Result
!Record
!Opponent
!Type
!Round, time
!Date
!Location
!Notes
|-align=center
|60
|Loss
|49–9–2
|align=left| Łukasz Różanski
|KO
|1 (10)
|09 Sep 2017
|align=left|
|
|-align=center
|59
|Loss
|49–8–2
|align=left| Andrzej Wawrzyk
|RTD
|5 (10)
|17 Sep 2016
|align=left|
|align=left|
|-align=center
|58
|Win
|49–7–2
|align=left| Andras Csomor
|TKO
|2 (8), 
|18 Mar 2016
|align=left|
|
|-align=center
|57
|Loss
|48–7–2
|align=left| Marcin Rekowski
|TKO
|7 (10), 
|31 May 2014
|align=left|
|
|-align=center
|56
|Win
|48–6–2
|align=left| Wladimir Letr
|TKO
|1 (6), 
|26 Apr 2014
|align=left|
|
|-align=center
|55
|Loss
|47–6–2
|align=left| Martin Rogan
|TKO
|3 (3), 
|23 Feb 2013
|align=left|
|align=left|
|-align=center
|54
|Loss
|47–5–2
|align=left| Kevin Johnson
|SD
|3
|20 Jun 2012
|align=left|
|align=left|
|-align=center
|53
|Win
|47–4–2
|align=left| Maurice Harris
|SD
|3
|20 Jun 2012
|align=left|
|align=left|
|-align=center
|52
| Draw
|46–4–2
|align=left| Hastings Rasani
|PTS
|6
|09 Nov 2011
|align=left|
|
|-align=center
|51
| Loss
|46–4–1
|align=left| Alexander Dimitrenko
|KO
|12 (12)
|26 Mar 2011
|align=left|
|align=left|
|-align=center
|50
| Win
|46–3–1
|align=left| Paul Butlin
|TKO
|1 (8)
|25 Sep 2010
|align=left|
|
|-
|49
| Loss
|45–3–1
|align=left| Vitali Klitschko
|KO
|10 (12)
|29 May 2010
|align=left|
|align=left|
|-align=center
|-
|48
| Win
|45–2–1
|align=left| Paolo Vidoz
|UD
|12
|18 Dec 2009
|align=left|
|align=left|
|-
|47
| Draw
|44–2–1
|align=left| Francesco Pianeta
|PTS
|12
|4 May 2009
|align=left|
|align=left|
|-
|46
| Win
|44–2
|align=left| Danny Williams
|TKO
|8 (10)
|08 Nov 2008
|align=left| 
|align=left|
|-align=center
|45
|Loss
|43–2
|align=left| Zuri Lawrence
|UD
|8
|06/08/2008
|align=left| 
|align=left|
|-align=center
|44
|Win
|43–1
|align=left| Terrell Nelson
|TKO
|5 
|25/04/2008
|align=left| 
|align=left|
|-align=center
|43
|Win
|42–1
|align=left| Colin Kenna
|PTS
|5 
|25/01/2008
|align=left| 
|align=left|
|-align=center
|42
|Win
|41–1
|align=left| Manuel Alberto Pucheta
|KO
|2 
|15/09/2007
|align=left| 
|align=left|
|-align=center
|41
|Win
|40–1
|align=left| Steve Herelius
|TKO
|9 
|08/06/2007
|align=left| 
|align=left|
|-align=center
|40
|Win
|39–1
|align=left| Lawrence Tauasa
|MD
|12
|04/11/2006
|align=left| 
|align=left|
|-align=center
|39
|Win
|38–1
|align=left| Osborne Machimana
|UD
|10
|25/05/2006
|align=left| 
|align=left|
|-align=center
|38
|Win
|37–1
|align=left| Orlin Norris
|MD
|6
|28/05/2005
|align=left| 
|align=left|
|-align=center
|37
|Win
|36–1
|align=left| Travis Fulton
|TKO
|2 
|19/03/2005
|align=left| 
|align=left|
|-align=center
|36
|Win
|35–1
|align=left| Tommy Connelly
|TKO
|2 
|22/01/2005
|align=left| 
|align=left|
|-align=center
|35
|Win
|34–1
|align=left| Kenny Craven
|KO
|2 
|11/09/2004
|align=left| 
|align=left|
|-align=center
|34
|Win
|33–1
|align=left| Wojciech Bartnik
|PTS
|6
|26/06/2004
|align=left| 
|align=left|
|-align=center
|33
|Win
|32–1
|align=left| Paul King
|PTS
|4
|10/04/2004
|align=left| 
|align=left|
|-align=center
|32
|Win
|31–1
|align=left| Greg Scott Briggs
|KO
|2 
|31/01/2004
|align=left| 
|align=left|
|-align=center
|31
|Win
|30–1
|align=left| Chris Woollas
|TKO
|1 
|22/11/2003
|align=left| 
|align=left|
|-align=center
|30
|Win
|29–1
|align=left| Jason Brewster
|TKO
|2 
|05/07/2003
|align=left| 
|align=left|
|-align=center
|29
|Win
|28–1
|align=left| Michael Holden
|PTS
|6
|12/04/2003
|align=left| 
|align=left|
|-align=center
|28
|Win
|27–1
|align=left| Mindaugas Kulikauskas
|TKO
|2 
|08/03/2003
|align=left| 
|align=left|
|-align=center
|27
|Win
|26–1
|align=left| Jacklord Jacobs
|PTS
|6
|07/12/2002
|align=left| 
|align=left|
|-align=center
|26
|Win
|25–1
|align=left| Paul Bonson
|PTS
|4
|27/07/2002
|align=left| 
|align=left|
|-align=center
|25
|Win
|24–1
|align=left| Jacob Odhiambo
|KO
|1 
|09/03/2002
|align=left| 
|align=left|
|-align=center
|24
|Win
|23–1
|align=left| Cătălin Zmărăndescu
|KO
|1 
|22/01/2002
|align=left| 
|align=left|
|-align=center
|23
|Win
|22–1
|align=left| Robert Măgureanu
|TKO
|4 
|27/10/2001
|align=left| 
|align=left|
|-align=center
|22
|Win
|21–1
|align=left| Stanyslav Tomkachov
|TKO
|3 
|13/10/2001
|align=left| 
|align=left|
|-align=center
|21
|Win
|20–1
|align=left| Dirk Wallyn
|UD
|6
|07/07/2001
|align=left| 
|align=left|
|-align=center
|20
|Loss
|19–1
|align=left| Arthur Cook
|KO
|9 
|17/03/2001
|align=left| 
|align=left|
|-align=center
|19
|Win
|19–0
|align=left| Michael Murray
|TKO
|5 
|27/11/2000
|align=left| 
|align=left|
|-align=center
|18
|Win
|18–0
|align=left| Everett Martin
|TKO
|7 
|30/09/2000
|align=left| 
|align=left|
|-align=center
|17
|Win
|17–0
|align=left| Dan Conway
|UD
|4
|19/08/2000
|align=left| 
|align=left|
|-align=center
|16
|Win
|16–0
|align=left| Clarence Goins
|TKO
|2 
|24/06/2000
|align=left| 
|align=left|
|-align=center
|15
|Win
|15–0
|align=left| Neil Kirkwood
|TKO
|1 
|27/05/2000
|align=left| 
|align=left|
|-align=center
|14
|Win
|14–0
|align=left| Slobodan Popovic
|KO
|1 
|08/04/2000
|align=left| 
|align=left|
|-align=center
|13
|Win
|13–0
|align=left| Luke Simpkin
|PTS
|4
|11/03/2000
|align=left| 
|align=left|
|-align=center
|12
|Win
|12–0
|align=left| Henry Kolle Njume
|PTS
|6
|20/11/1999
|align=left| 
|align=left|
|-align=center
|11
|Win
|11–0
|align=left| Jeff Lally
|TKO
|3 
|22/10/1999
|align=left| 
|align=left|
|-align=center
|10
|Win
|10–0
|align=left| Ignacio Orsola
|KO
|1 
|18/09/1999
|align=left| 
|align=left|
|-align=center
|9
|Win
|9–0
|align=left| Bruno Foster
|TKO
|6 
|17/07/1999
|align=left| 
|align=left|
|-align=center
|8
|Win
|8–0
|align=left| Biko Botowamungu
|UD
|4
|26/06/1999
|align=left| 
|align=left|
|-align=center
|7
|Win
|7–0
|align=left| Gary Williams
|TKO
|4 
|28/05/1999
|align=left| 
|align=left|
|-align=center
|6
|Win
|6–0
|align=left| Stipe Balic
|PTS
|4
|17/04/1999
|align=left| 
|align=left|
|-align=center
|5
|Win
|5–0
|align=left| Chris Woollas
|PTS
|4
|12/03/1999
|align=left| 
|align=left|
|-align=center
|4
|Win
|4–0
|align=left| Viktor Juhasz
|TKO
|1 
|13/02/1999
|align=left| 
|align=left|
|-align=center
|3
|Win
|3–0
|align=left| Rene Hanl
|PTS
|4
|02/10/1998
|align=left| 
|align=left|
|-align=center
|2
|Win
|2–0
|align=left| Andrzej Dziewulski
|TKO
|4 
|25/09/1998
|align=left| 
|align=left|
|-align=center
|1
|Win
|1–0
|align=left| Jan Drobena
|TKO
|1 
|22/07/1998
|align=left| 
|align=left|
|-align=center

References

External links
 Official Website
 

1979 births
Living people
Boxers from Warsaw
Heavyweight boxers
European Boxing Union champions
Polish male boxers